Goyder South Wind Farm is the first stage of the Goyder Renewables Zone development near Burra, South Australia. The Goyder South Wind Farm will be on the hills south-east of the town of Burra.

Early construction works for stage 1 began in December 2021. The project is owned by Neoen and the construction contract was awarded to a consortium of GE Renewable Energy and Elecnor.

Generation capacity of stage 1 is anticipated to be 412MW. The Government of the Australian Capital Territory has signed a 14-year contract for 100MW of electricity. Generation will be from 75 GE 5.5-158 Cypress wind turbines. It will have a new transmission line to connect to the Robertstown substation. It is expected to be operational in 2024.

The Goyder South Wind Farm proposal has replaced the 119 MW Stony Gap Wind Farm which had been proposed for the same area, originally by EnergyAustralia who sold it to Palisade Investment Partners in 2017 before Neoen bought the proposal in September 2019 and included it in the larger plan.

References

Mid North (South Australia)
Proposed wind farms in Australia
Wind farms in South Australia